Apple has produced several lines of printers in its history, but no longer produces or supports these devices today. Though some early products use thermal technology, Apple's products can be broadly divided into three lines: ImageWriter (dot matrix), LaserWriter (PostScript laser), and StyleWriter (thermal inkjet).

Early products
Apple's first printer was the Apple Silentype, released in June 1979, shortly after the Apple II Plus. The Silentype was a thermal printer, which used a special paper and provided 80 column output. Also compatible with the Apple III, the Silentype was a rebranded Trendcom 200.

The Apple Dot Matrix Printer (often shortened to Apple DMP) is a printer manufactured by C. Itoh and sold under Apple label in 1982 for the Apple II series, Lisa, and the Apple III. Apple followed this release with a Qume daisy wheel engine, the Apple Letter Quality Printer (also known as the Apple Daisy Wheel Printer), in January 1983.  This printer could print at forty characters per second. Also in 1983, Apple released its only plotter, the Apple Color Plotter. This printer moved and rotated four color pens along the horizontal axis, the device moving the paper into order to allow its pens to render along the vertical axis. The Apple Scribe Printer was a thermal transfer printer, first introduced in 1984 alongside the Apple IIc for a relatively low retail price, and compatible with the Apple IIe computer.

Dot-matrix series

Laser printer series 

The LaserWriter was a laser printer with built-in PostScript interpreter introduced by Apple in 1985. It was one of the first laser printers available to the mass market. In combination with WYSIWYG publishing software like PageMaker, that operated on top of the graphical user interface of Macintosh computers, the LaserWriter was a key component at the beginning of the desktop publishing revolution.

Inkjet series 

The StyleWriter was the first of Apple's line of inkjet serial printers, targeted mainly towards consumers. They produced print quality that was better than the dot matrix ImageWriters, and were cheaper than the LaserWriters. All but a few models contained Canon print engines, a few were rebadged Canon printers, while the last few were rebadged HP DeskJet printers.

The Apple Color Printer was the first color inkjet printer sold by Apple. Introduced in 1993 alongside the StyleWriter II, it was a rebadged Canon BJC-820 printer. Its maximum resolution was 360 DPI and connected to the computer via SCSI. Unlike many inkjet printers of the time, the Apple Color Printer did not suffer from print slowdowns caused by slow communication from the computer performing rasterization, since the SCSI bus is relatively fast. The model was discontinued in 1994 when Apple introduced the Color StyleWriter series of printers.

References

External links
 Technical Specifications for Apple Color Printer
 Edwards, Benj (10 December 2009). "A look back at Apple's Printers". Macworld.

Apple Inc. printers
printers